Escuminac is a municipality in Quebec, Canada, on the north shore of the Restigouche River.

In addition to Escuminac itself, the municipality also includes the communities of Escuminac Flats, Fleurant, and Pointe-à-la-Garde.

According to missionary Joseph-Étienne Guinard, Escuminac is a Mi'kmaq word meaning "here are small fruits", originally identifying a point of land jutting into the Restigouche River. But this translation has been disputed as fanciful. It has been spelled in various ways over time, including Semenac, Scamanac, Scaumenac, Escouminac, Scoumenac, and Scouminac.

History

The area was first colonized by American Loyalist farmers and loggers.

In 1845, the Municipality of Shoolbred, which included the area now known as Nouvelle, was first incorporated. It was named after John Shoolbred, who was the first owner of the seignory granted there. In 1847, the municipality was abolished but re-established in 1855. From 1861 on, it was known as the Township Municipality of Nouvelle-et-Shoolbred.

In 1907, the township municipality was split into the Municipalities of Nouvelle-et-Shoolbred-Partie-Nord-Est (that became Nouvelle in 1953) and Nouvelle-et-Shoolbred-Partie-Sud-Ouest. This latter one was renamed to Escuminac in 1912.

Demographics

Population

Language
Mother tongue:
 English as first language: 38.6%
 French as first language: 61.4%
 English and French as first language: 0%
 Other as first language: 0%

See also
 Escuminac River
 Escuminac, New Brunswick
 Chaleur Bay
 List of municipalities in Quebec

References

Incorporated places in Gaspésie–Îles-de-la-Madeleine
Municipalities in Quebec